Gideon Allan Oboma (1930–2012) was an Anglican bishop in Uganda:

Oboma was born on 22 October 1932 at Atiak, Amuru District and educated at Uganda Christian University. A former teacher, he was ordained deacon in 1967 and priest in 1969. In 1976 he was appointed Dean of Gulu. He was appointed an Assistant Bishop of Northern Uganda on 14 January 1979. He retired in 1998.

References

Anglican bishops of Northern Uganda
20th-century Anglican bishops in Uganda
2012 deaths
1932 births
People from Amuru District
Uganda Christian University alumni